In cricket, a five-wicket haul—also known as a five–for or fifer—refers to a bowler taking five or more wickets in a single innings. This is regarded as a notable achievement; only five bowlers have taken more than 30 five-wicket hauls in their Test cricketing careers. Sri Lankan cricketer Muttiah Muralitharan has the most five-wicket hauls in Test cricket, and also the second-highest number of five-wicket hauls in One Day Internationals (ODI). He did not take any five-wicket hauls in a Twenty20 International, where his best bowling figures were 3 wickets for 29 runs. One of the most experienced bowlers in international cricket, Muralitharan is the leading wicket taker in both Tests and ODIs. He was declared as the "best bowler ever" in Test cricket by the Wisden Cricketers' Almanack in 2002, and the Sri Lankan team depended heavily on the off spinner for wickets.

Muralitharan is well ahead of other bowlers by number of five-wicket hauls in Tests with 67 to his name; Australian cricketer Shane Warne ranks in second place with 37. Making his Test debut in 1992, Muralitharan took his first five-wicket haul a year later against South Africa. He performed this feat against every other Test playing nation. He went on to take ten or more wickets per match on 22 occasions—also a world record—while Shane Warne ranks second, having achieved this on 10 occasions. His career best is 9 wickets for 51 runs against Zimbabwe, which ranks as the world's fifth-best figures in an innings. He was most successful against Bangladesh and South Africa, with 11 five-wicket hauls against each team. Fourteen of Muralitharan's five-wicket hauls were taken at the Sinhalese Sports Club Ground (SSC) in Colombo, Sri Lanka. He retired from Test cricket in July 2010, capturing his 67th and final five-wicket haul during his last match.

In ODIs, Muralitharan is ranked second in number of five-wicket hauls to Pakistani cricketer Waqar Younis. He played his first ODI in 1993, and took his first ODI five-wicket haul in 1998 against Pakistan. He repeated this performance against seven different opponents. His career best of 7 wickets for 30 runs is the fourth-best bowling figures in ODI history.

Key

Tests

One Day Internationals

Notes

References
Specific

General

External links
Player profile of Muralitharan at Cricinfo

Muralitharan
Muralitharan, Muttiah